The NIFL Development League (prior to 2016, the NIFL Reserve League) is an intermediate Association football league in Northern Ireland consisting of the reserve teams of the twelve NIFL Premiership clubs.

Current members (2022–23)
Ballymena United Reserves
Carrick Rangers Reserves
Cliftonville Olympic
Coleraine Reserves
Crusaders Reserves
Dungannon Swifts Reserves
Glenavon Reserves
Glentoran II
Larne Olympic
Linfield Swifts
Newry City Reserves
Portadown Reserves

History
The NIFL Development League is the successor to the NIFL Reserve League, which in turn was the successor to the Irish League B Division Section 2 which was formed in 1977, when the B Division split into two sections: Section 1 for intermediate clubs and the other for the reserve teams of senior clubs. Since the foundation of the B Division in 1951, these two categories of teams had competed together. In 1999, Section 1 of the B Division was renamed the Irish League Second Division and Section 2 became the Irish League Reserve League. In 2003, on the formation of the Irish Premier League, the IFA took direct control and the league was renamed the IFA Reserve League. In 2013, the Northern Ireland Football League took over, and the league was again renamed, to the NIFL Reserve League. In 2016, it became the NIFL Development League, with an age restriction imposed on players.

List of champions

Irish League B Division Section 2

Irish League Reserve League

IFA Reserve League

NIFL Reserve League

NIFL Premiership Development League

Summary of champions

See also
George Wilson Cup
NIFL Premiership
NIFL Championship
NIFL Premier Intermediate League
Irish Intermediate Cup
Northern Ireland football league system

References

Association football leagues in Northern Ireland
Reserve football leagues in Europe
Sports leagues established in 1977
1977 establishments in Northern Ireland